Andriy Sokolenko (born 8 June 1978) is a former Ukrainian football defender.

External links 
 
 
 

1978 births
Living people
Ukrainian footballers
Association football defenders
Ukrainian expatriate footballers
Expatriate footballers in Belarus
Expatriate footballers in Kazakhstan
Expatriate footballers in Azerbaijan
Ukrainian Premier League players
Kazakhstan Premier League players
SC Tavriya Simferopol players
FC Dynamo Saky players
FC Spartak Ivano-Frankivsk players
FC Kryvbas Kryvyi Rih players
FC Kryvbas-2 Kryvyi Rih players
FC Volyn Lutsk players
FC Dinamo Minsk players
FC Aktobe players
FC Obolon-Brovar Kyiv players
FC Kharkiv players
FC Prykarpattia Ivano-Frankivsk (2004) players
Simurq PIK players
FC Enerhetyk Burshtyn players
Sportspeople from Simferopol